Jiaozhou may refer to:

Jiaozhou Bay, a sea gulf in Qingdao, Shandong, China
Jiaozhou City, a county-level city near the bay
Jiaozhou (region), an ancient region which included modern North Vietnam, Guangxi, Guangdong, and Hainan
Jiaozhi, a commandery within the Jiaozhou region